The Mourning of Muharram (also known as Azadari, Remembrance of Muharram or Muharram Observances) is a set of commemoration rituals observed primarily by Shia people. The commemoration falls in Muharram, the first month of the Islamic calendar. Many of the events associated with the ritual take place in congregation halls known as Hussainia or Imambargah.

The event marks the anniversary of the Battle of Karbala (AD 680/AH 61), when Imam Hussain ibn Ali, a grandson of Prophet Muhammad, was martyred by the forces of Ubayd Allah ibn Ziyad, on the orders of Yazid I. Family members and companions accompanying him were either killed or subjected to humiliation. The commemoration of this event during the yearly mourning season, with the Day of Ashura as the focal date, serves to define Shia communal identity. Muharram observances are carried out in countries with a sizable Shia Muslim population.

Storytelling, weeping and chest beating, wearing black, partial fasting, street processions, and re-enactments of the Battle of Karbala form the crux of the observances. Self-flagellation has been practiced but is now considered haram (prohibited) by some namely Irani Usuli Shia authorities (maraji).

Etymology 
The word Muharram comes from Arabic which is the name of the first month of the year in the Islamic calendar. The words Azadari (Persian: عزاداری) or Sogvari (سوگواری) which mean mourning and lamentation; and Majalis-e Aza have been exclusively used in connection with the remembrance ceremonies for the martyrdom of Imam Hussain (A.S). Majalis-e Aza, also known as Aza-e Husayn, includes mourning congregations, lamentations, matam and all such actions which express the emotions of grief and above all, revulsion against what Yazid I stood for.

In India and Pakistan it is called matam or matam-dari/sina aannee (chest beating). 

In recent years there has been a rise in English eulogies with added chest beating across the western world expressing sorrow and grief, predominantly in London, UK. Whilst matam being recited in English is still relatively new, the works of renowned reciter Sayed Ali Radhawi and respected published poet Nouri Sardar have helped push mourning to an English audience. 

Muharram rituals was often called by European observers "the Feast of Hasan and Hosayn," as the participants shout "Hasan! Hosayn!"

The term majalis has both a grammatical meaning and a meaning which relates to Aza-e-Husayn. In its technical sense, a majalis is a meeting, a session or a gathering.

History 
According to Shia sources, the mourning of Muharram was started by the family, especially women, of Muhammad (the Ahl-ul-Bayt) immediately after the death of his grandson and even before entering Damascus. Following the Battle of Karbala, Muhammad's granddaughter Zaynab bint Ali and sister of Imam Husayn, began mourning for the fallen and making speeches against Imam Husayn ibn Ali's opponents: Ibn Ziyad, Yazid I, Umar Ibne Saad, Shimr ibn Dhil-jawshan and Hurmala. News of Imam Husayn ibn Ali's martyrdom was spread by Imam Zain-ul-Abideen, who succeeded Imam Husayn as the Shia Imam, via sermons and speeches throughout Iraq, Syria and Hejaz.

According to the History of the Prophets and Kings, when Ali ibn Husayn Zayn al-Abidin gave the sermon in presence of Yazid, he let them hold the mourning of Husain ibn Ali for three days in a formal manner.

In the Umayyad Caliphate, the mourning of Husain ibn Ali's Killing was performed furtively in the homes of Shia Imam and their followers, but during the Abbasid Caliphate this mourning was observed in public mosques by the Abbasid rulers to draw people's attention.

During the Fatimid Caliphate, Imam Al-Mu'izz li-Din Allah (d. 365/975), the 14th Ismaili imam, instructed Syedna Al-Qadi al-Nu'man to proclaim in his Friday sermon the significance of ʿAashura and elucidate the manner in which it should be commemorated. Al-Maqrizi (d. 845/1442), a medieval Egyptian historian, notes that in the Fatimi empire the Day of ʿAashura was marked as a day of grief and markets were shut. During Imam Al-Mustansir Billah's (d. 427/1094) era, the 18th Ismaili Imam, audiences were encouraged to explicitly express sorrow and tears on the occasion of ʿAashura as written in the majalis authored by Syedna Al-Mu'ayyad fi'l-Din al-Shirazi (470/1078). The 20th Musta'li Isma'ili Imam, Al-Amir bi-Ahkam Allah (526/1132), presided over a congregation on the Day of ʿAashura seated on an un-cushioned chair made of palm branches. The Imam wore a veil that day, and the reporter, Ibn al-Ma'mun, writes that sorrow and grief were clearly visible in his countenance. Ibn al-Tuwayr records that on the Day of ʿAashura, the royal carpets in the palace would be replaced with straw mats. 

As Chelkowski said, in fourth century in Baghdad, contemporaneous with the reigns of Sulton Muizz ad-Dawla of the Shia Buyid dynasty, the first public mourning ritual happened, and the market was closed by order of him on day of Ashura. The mourning rituals evolved differently in different places, until the Safavid dynasty established a centralized Shia state in the 16th century: The annual mourning ceremonies and ritual cursing of Husayn's enemies acquired the status of a national institution. According to popular belief, Shia rituals spread to South Asia starting at the end of the 14th Century with the conquests of Tamerlane. Observance has since spread to countries such as India, Pakistan, Iraq, Iran, Turkey, Afghanistan, Syria, Nigeria, Tanzania, Saudi Arabia, Bangladesh, Yemen, Bahrain, Azerbaijan and Lebanon.

Customs and rituals

Shia Muslims around the world every year commemorate the mourning custom of death of Husayn ibn Ali, his family and his follower in months of Muharram and Safar. The type of mourning of Muharram varies between branches of Shia and different ethnic groups.

According to the Shia belief, taking part in the mourning ritual will be a help to salvation on the Day of Judgment, as Elias Canetti (winner of Nobel Prize) said "[it] became the very core of the Shiite faith ... of all the traditional religions of lament which could be adduced for closer consideration – that of the Islamic is the most illuminating... The lament itself, as an impassioned pack opening out, to a true crowd, manifests itself with unforgettable power at the Muharram Festival Shiites".

At first the mourning ceremonies and custom have been done in the open air at the main thoroughfare of city of village, a major intersection in the bazaar, the yard of the mosque, caravanserai and private homes. After a while, in order to protect mourners from weather, the Hussainiya and the Tekyeh were built.

After almost 12 centuries, five types of major rituals were developed around the battle of Karbala. These rituals include the memorial services (majalis al-ta'ziya), the visitation of Husayn's tomb in Karbala particularly on the occasion of the tenth day of Ashura and the fortieth day after the battle (Ziyarat Ashura and ziyarat al-Arba'in), the public mourning processions (Al-mawakib Al-husayniyya or the representation of the battle of Karbala in the form of a play (the ), and the flagellation.

Pilgrimage to the shrine of Husayn

Imam Husayn Shrine is located at the mosque and burial site of Husayn ibn Ali, the third Shia Imam in the city of Karbala, Iraq. Many Shia go on a pilgrimage to the shrine in Karbala, one of the holiest places for Shias apart from Mecca, Medina and Jerusalem. Up to one million pilgrims visit the city annually to observe the anniversary of Imam Husayn ibn Ali's death. Shia Muslims believe that pilgrimage to Husayn ibn Ali's shrine, like weeping, wipes out their sins to a great extent.

Matam

The Arabic term matam refers in general to an act or gesture of mourning; in Shia Islam the term designates acts of lamentation for the martyrs of Karbala. Male and female participants congregate in public for ceremonial chest beating (matam- سینہ زنی) as a display of their devotion to Imam Husayn and in remembrance of his suffering. In some Shi'a societies, such as those in Bahrain, Pakistan, India, Afghanistan, Iran, Syria, Bangladesh and Iraq, male participants may incorporate knives or razors swung upon chains into their matam. There are two basic forms of matam: 
 matam using one's hands only, that is, sineh-zani or chest-beating
 matam with implements like chains, knives, swords and blades, that is, zanjeer-zani(زنجیر زنی), qama-zani (قمع زنی), etc.
Matam in South Asia is the most significant and sensitive Shia identity marker, although the act is also condemned by some Shi'a religious leaders.

Tatbir

A form of ritual bloodletting, practiced as an act of mourning by some Shia Muslims (it is a forbidden act according to some Grand Ayatollahs), for the younger grandson of Muhammad, Husayn ibn Ali, who was killed along with his children, companions and near relatives at the Battle of Karbala by the Umayyad Caliph Yazid I. The practice was first introduced by the Qizilbash tribe who were instrumental in establishing the Safavid rule. Tatbir is a contested issue among Shia. Most clerics deem it to be self-harm and hence haram. However, a small minority of Shia do partake in this act, usually in the South Asian region.

Taziya

One form of mourning is the theatrical re-enactment of the Battle of Karbala. In Iran this is called taziya or taziyeh. Theatrical groups that specialize in taziya are called taziya groups. Taziyas were popular through the Qajar dynasty until the early twentieth century, but the re-enactments slowly declined until they were mostly abandoned in the large cities by the early 1940s. Nonetheless, taziyas continued to exist in Iran on a smaller scale especially in more rural and traditional areas. Reza Shah, the first of the Pahlavi dynasty, had outlawed taziyas.

Noha
By increasing the number of shia Muslim in cities and states, Muharram rituals have changed to a more elaborate form. In the ninth century, lamentation and wailing became propounded as a mourning tradition. Noha is the poem and story that be inspired from Maqtal al-Husayn (various books which narrate the story of the battle of Karbala and the death of Husayn ibn Ali) . The poet or another one read the noha with plaintive rhythm. The main subject of noha is the pain from the killing of Husayn ibn Ali. Noha consists of poems in different languages such as Arabic, Urdu, Farsi, Saraeki, Sindhi and Punjabi.

Weeping
The reaction of the audience in the reenactment of the Battle of Karbala episode is significant for the strengthening of distinct Shia identity and the weeping over the killing of Husayn ibn Ali as and his follower is one of these reactions. There is close relation between the lamentation and weeping. According to the narration, Shia imams had emphasized to weep for them, so it had transmitted to future generation. According to Shia tradition, the weeping and the flow of tears provides condolences to Imam Husayn's mother and his family, as the living relatives (mostly women and children) were not allowed to weep or lament over their martyred family which involved Imam Husayn's, his family (including his two sons, a six-month-old baby martyred by an arrow/spear to his neck and another 18 year old who took a spear to his heart) and his companions. Lamenting and weeping for the (mazloom) wronged and offering condolences to his family, thus, will serve as one of the good deeds done by the mourners of Husayn and will be helpful in saving them from being condemned to hell fire on the day of judgment.

Processions 
Depending on the condition of society, the Muharram processions changes from one city to another. The common form is the starting of mourning processions from Hussainiya and the participants would parade through the streets of their town or village, finally they come back to Hussainiya for performing other mourning of Muharram's ritual. The procession was common ritual's mourning of dead persons in Arabic states before the appearance of Islam. The chest-beating, flagellation and face-slapping (latm) are usual acts doing during the mourning procession, but chest-beating and face-slapping (latm) have more precedence and the history of doing this acts had been reached to Buyid dynasty period.

Chest beating 
 
Chest beating refer to common rituals practiced in mourning ceremonies of Shia Imams. In the nineteenth century, the Iranian practiced chest-beating introduced by Indian Syed Dildar Ali Nasirabadi and the chest-beating was attributed to the concept of Zuljinah (the horse with two wings) processions. The chest beating is allowed just in calamities belong to the family of Muhammad.
At the Isfahanis' mosque, mourners just gather into the middle of the courtyard bared their upper torsos هn the form of a procession and began randomly beating their chests to the melodic suggestions.

Flagellation
Acts of flagellation are a symbolic reenacting of the blood-shedding of Husayn ibn Ali. The previous record of this dramatic act reaches back to the seventeenth century practice in the Caucasus and in Azerbaijan, and was observed in the nineteenth century by the Shia Twelvers in central and southern cities of Iran and the Arab world.
There were various types of flagellation including striking of chests with the palms, striking of backs with chains, and cutting foreheads with knives or swords. In 1993, Ayatollah Seyyed Ali Khamenei, leader of Iran issued a fatwa calling flagellation wrong, fake and false. He later argued that while the communist regime of USSR closed or changed many mosques and banned many other Islamic practices in Azerbaijan, they allowed flagellation. While the fatwa is not obligatory to followers of other Maraji, official stance of Iranian government is that of the leader, so that flagellation is not openly practiced in Iran anymore.

Rawda

Rawda is one of the Shia Iranian mourning rituals to commemorate the death of Husayn ibn Ali and his followers – especially it is the kind of public lamentation. Rawda means garden in Arabic language and this name is acquired from the title of Rawdat al-Shuhada, literary masterpiece book authored by Husayn Waiz Kashifi in Persian. The word of Rawda-khawani means "recitation from Rawdat alshuhada" and generally is named Rawda. At first this ritual became customary on first ten days of Muharram, but by passing of time it was performed during Muharam and Safar and other days of year. Today, Rawda is either the story of Rawdat of al-Shuhada or stories that Rawḍa-k̲h̲ w ān (person who does the recitation) creates by his skills and knowledge to release the original text of the book. This ritual can be held at every where such as houses, the yard of mosque, the square of city or village and also Hussainiya and the Tekyeh. The origin place of Rawda was Iran, but then at Bahrain this ritual is seen in its original form and at other place like India, the modified form of it is held.

Alam
One of the most important and symbolic objects used at mourning rituals is the Alam. It is the ensign of Husayn ibn Ali in the Battle of Karbala and a sign of truth and bravery. During the battle of Karbala, the original standard-bearer of Husayn ibn Ali's kafala (caravan) was Abbas, Husayn's brother. Abbas lost his life in battle when he went to retrieve water from the Euphrates River for the caravan's young children who were thirsty for three days. It is narrated that when he started to ride back to the camp with the water, he was surprise-attacked. While in battle, the children of the camp were anxiously watching the alam (Arabic and Persian ʿalam, pl. aʿlām, 'standard' or 'banner') dip up and down from afar. Abbas lost both of his arms in battle yet he still continued to clench the water skin (mushk) with his teeth, determined to bring the water back to the children. The leader of the opposition saw Abbas gaining ground and ordered for more army men to attack the flag bearer, stating, "If water is brought back to their tent, there is no stopping them." Archers then started bombarding Abbas with arrows which pierced the water skin, bringing him down from his horse with the alam falling to the ground. Alams are a reminder of Abbas' martyrdom, and act as a symbol of affection and salutation towards the followers of Husayn ibn Ali who lost their lives in Karbala. Alams all vary in size but usually consist of a wood pole base, with a metal finial and cross-bar that is fixated at the top of the pole. The pole is then dressed with cloth and a banner with the names of Muhammad's family members. Alams with Abbas' name usually include an ornament that resembles the water skin that he intended to fill for the children. The length of an Alam can be about 15 feet. An Alam consists of flexible steel plates placed at the upper part of it. Also, an Alam is decorated by plumes and fine embroidered silks and brocades.

Nakhl Gardani

Nakhl Gardani is a religious ritual carried out on the day of Ashura for commemorating the death of Husayn ibn Ali's death. Nakhl is a wooden (lit. date-palm) structure used as a symbolic representation of the Imam's coffin, and nakhl-gardani is the act of carrying the nakhl in procession, resembling Imam's funeral.

By geography

Indian Subcontinent 

In South Asia, literary and musical genres produced by both Shias and Sunnis, that have been inspired by the Battle of Karbala are performed during the month, such as marsiya, noha and soaz. This is meant to increase the people's understanding of how the enemies fought The Battle of Karbala against Imam Husayn and his followers.

In Hyderabad, the Bibi-Ka-Alam procession is taken annually to mark the date.

Caribbean 
In Trinidad and Tobago and Jamaica all ethnic and religious communities participate in the event, locally known as "Hosay" or "Hussay".

Indonesia 
In Indonesia, the event is known as Tabuik (Minangkabau language) or Tabut (Indonesian).

Mauritius 
In Mauritius the event is also known as Ghoon Festival or Yamsé. Since the 1800s a group of believers have celebrated the 10th day of Muharram and first month of the Islamic calendar in the locality called Plaine Verte within the capital city Port Louis Mauritius.

Gallery

See also
Hussainia
Carpet Washing Ceremony
Holy Week, a week-long festival of mourning for the death of Jesus observed by Christians.
List of casualties in Husayn's army at the Battle of Karbala
List of the terrorist actions against the Mourning of Muharram
Azadari in Lucknow
Ziyarat Ashura

References

Further reading

 Reprinted in European volume (1997)

External links

 Kashaf-ul-Haqaiq (کشف الحقائق)
 Athna Ashri Akhbari Islamic School of Thoughts

 Is Mourning of Muharram permissible?
 Description of breast beating portion of Muharram mourning ceremonies
 Azadari is a Way of Life
 A Brief Introduction to Majalis and Azadari

Shia days of remembrance
 
Islamic holy days
Hussainiya